The 1994 SANFL season was the 115th season of the highest level Australian rules football competition in South Australia.

Ladder

Finals

Grand Final

References 

SANFL
South Australian National Football League seasons